Bagdad Cafe (sometimes Bagdad Café, titled Out of Rosenheim in Germany) is a 1987 English-language West German film directed by Percy Adlon. It is a comedy-drama set in a remote truck stop and motel in the Mojave Desert in the U.S. state of California. Inspired by Carson McCullers' novella The Ballad of the Sad Café (1951), the film centers on two women who have recently separated from their husbands, and the blossoming friendship that ensues. It runs 95 minutes in the U.S. and 108 minutes in the German version. The song Calling You, sung by Jevetta Steele and written by Bob Telson,  was nominated for the Academy Award for Best Original Song at the 61st Academy Awards.

Plot
German tourists Jasmin Münchgstettner (Sägebrecht) from Rosenheim and her husband fight while driving across the desert. She storms out of the car and makes her way to the isolated truck stop, which is run by the tough-as-nails and short-tempered Brenda (Pounder), whose own husband, after an argument out front, is soon to leave as well. Jasmin takes a room at the adjacent motel. Initially suspicious of the foreigner, Brenda eventually befriends Jasmin and allows her to work at the cafe.

The cafe is visited by an assortment of colorful characters, including a strange ex-Hollywood set-painter (Palance) and a glamorous tattoo artist (Kaufmann). Brenda's son (Darron Flagg) plays J. S. Bach preludes on the piano. With an ability to quietly empathize with everyone she meets at the cafe, helped by a passion for cleaning and performing magic tricks, Jasmin gradually transforms the cafe and all the people in it.

Cast
 Marianne Sägebrecht as Jasmin Münchgstettner
 CCH Pounder as Brenda
 Jack Palance as Rudi Cox
 Christine Kaufmann as Debby
 Monica Calhoun as Phyllis
 Darron Flagg as Salomo
 George Aguilar as Cahuenga
 G. Smokey Campbell as Sal
 Hans Stadlbauer as Herr Münchgstettner
 Alan S. Craig as Eric
 Apesanahkwat as Sheriff Arnie

Production 
The script was inspired by a road trip across U.S. Route 66 taken by director Percy Adlon and his wife Eleanor, a producer, in 1984. The town of Barstow, California reminded the couple of "purgatory". The film was shot in sequence.

Reception
The film received positive reviews and critical acclaim. It holds an 85% approval rating on Rotten Tomatoes based on 20 reviews, with a weighted average of 6.8/10.

Roger Ebert awarded the film 3 and ½ stars in his review:"[Percy Adlon] is saying something in this movie about Europe and America, about the old and the new, about the edge of the desert as the edge of the American Dream. I am not sure exactly what it is, but that is comforting; if a director could assemble these strange characters and then know for sure what they were doing in the same movie together, he would be too confident to find the humor in their situation. The charm of "Bagdad Cafe" is that every character and every moment is unanticipated, obscurely motivated, of uncertain meaning and vibrating with life".
The film was successful at the European box office, and was one of the most financially successful foreign-language productions in the U.S. at that time, grossing $3.59 million.

The Japanese filmmaker Akira Kurosawa cited this movie as one of his 100 favorite films.

Awards and nominations
 1988: won Best Foreign Language Film at the 23rd Guldbagge Awards
 1988: won Bavarian Film Award Best Screenplay (Eleonore & Percy Adlon)
 1988: won Ernst Lubitsch Award (Percy Adlon)
 1989: nominated for the Oscar for Best Music, Original Song (Bob Telson) for the song "Calling You"
 1989: won Amanda Best Foreign Feature Film (Percy Adlon)
 1989: won Artios Best Casting for Feature Film, Comedy (Al Onorato and Jerold Franks)
 1989: won César Award for Best Foreign Film (Percy Adlon)

Television series

In 1990 the film was re-created as a television series starring James Gammon, Whoopi Goldberg, Cleavon Little, and Jean Stapleton, with Stapleton as the abandoned tourist, and Goldberg as the restaurant operator. In the TV version the tourist was no longer from Germany. The series was shot in the conventional multi-camera sitcom format, before a studio audience. The show did not attract a sizable audience and it was cancelled after two seasons.

Location

The setting, Bagdad, California, is a former town on U.S. Route 66. After being bypassed by Interstate 40 in 1973, it was abandoned and eventually razed. The cafe has become something of a tourist destination; to capitalize on the film, it changed its name to Bagdad Cafe. A small noticeboard on the cafe wall features snapshots of the film's cast and crew.

Soundtrack

The soundtrack features the songs "Calling You", written by Bob Telson and sung by Jevetta Steele, and "Brenda, Brenda" with lyrics by Lee Breuer and music by Bob Telson, sung by Jearlyn Steele, featuring the harmonica of William Galison, and also has a track in which the director narrates the story, including the film's missing scenes.

The principal piano pieces, performed by Darron Flagg, are preludes from Book I of Bach's The Well-Tempered Clavier: the C major, no. 1, BWV 845; the C major, BWV 846, no. 2; and the D major, no. 5, BWV 850.

Home media 
For the film's 30th anniversary in 2018, StudioCanal reissued Bagdad Cafe as a 4K digital restoration on DVD and Blu-ray. In April 2021, Shout! Factory re-released the film digitally.

References

External links
 
 Bagdad Cafe at AllMovie
 

1987 films
1987 comedy-drama films
West German films
Films directed by Percy Adlon
Films set in deserts
Films set in California
Films shot in California
Films shot in the Mojave Desert
Best Foreign Film César Award winners
Best Foreign Film Guldbagge Award winners
1980s English-language films
English-language German films
1980s feminist films
Films adapted into television shows
1980s female buddy films
Foreign films set in the United States